Victor Dickenson (August 6, 1906 – November 16, 1984) was an American jazz trombonist. His career began in the 1920s and continued through musical partnerships with Count Basie (1940–41), Sidney Bechet (1941), and Earl Hines.

Life and career 
Born in Xenia, Ohio, in 1906, Dickenson wanted to be a plasterer like his father, but he abandoned the idea after injuring himself by falling off a ladder. He studied organ from 1922, then changed to performing trombone with local bands. He made his recording debut in December 1930 as a vocalist with Luis Russell's band. He joined Blanche Calloway's orchestra in the early 1930s. He led his own groups both on the east and west coast between 1947 and the mid-1950s.

From then he was a session man. He appeared on the television program The Sound of Jazz in 1957 with Count Basie, Coleman Hawkins, Roy Eldridge, Gerry Mulligan, and Billie Holiday. He also recorded as a sideman with Jimmy Rushing (on Vanguard Records), Coleman Hawkins (Capitol and Prestige Records), Pee Wee Russell (Black Lion), Benny Carter (Bluebird and Black & Blue), Lester Young (Blue Note and Verve), Count Basie (Columbia and Pablo. In 1953, he recorded The Vic Dickenson Showcase for Vanguard with Ed Hall on clarinet and Ruby Braff on trumpet. In  1958, Sydney Bechet made him come to France and play record at Brussel exposal.

Dickenson was a member of "The World's Greatest Jazz Band", the house band at The Roosevelt Grill in New York City. He also performed at the same venue in a smaller group that featured him alongside trumpeter Bobby Hackett.

Dickenson is in Art Kane's photograph, A Great Day in Harlem, which includes trombonist Miff Mole.

Dickenson died in New York City in 1984 at the age of 78 as a result of cancer.

Discography

As leader/co-leader 
 Vic Dickenson Showcase, Vol. 1 (Vanguard, 1953)
 Vic Dickenson Showcase, Vol. 2 (Vanguard, 1954)
 Vic Dickenson Septet, Vol. 1 (Vanguard, 1954)
 Vic Dickenson Septet, Vol. 2 (Vanguard, 1954)
 Vic Dickenson Septet, Vol. 3 (Vanguard, 1954)
 Vic Dickenson Septet, Vol. 4 (Vanguard, 1954)
 Vic's Boston Story (Storyville, 1957)
 Mainstream (Atlantic, 1958)
Newport Jazz Festival All Stars (Atlantic, 1959 [1960]) with Buck Clayton, George Wein, Pee Wee Russell, Bud Freeman, Champ Jones and Jake Hanna
 In Holland (Riff, 1974)
 French Festival (Nice, France 1974) (Classic Jazz Music, 1974)
 Gentleman of the Trombone (Storyville, 1975)
 Vic Dickenson Quintet (SLP, 1976)
 Plays Bessie Smith: Trombone Cholly (Gazell, 1976)
 Roy Eldridge & Vic Dickenson With Eddie Locke & His Friends (Storyville, 1978)
 New York Axis: Phil Wilson & Vic Dickenson (Famous Door, 1980)
 Just Friends (Sackville, 1985)
 Live at Music Room (Valley Vue, 1996)
 Backstage with Bobby Hackett: Milwaukee 1951 (Jasmine, 2000)
 Swing That Music (Black & Blue, 2002)

As sideman 
With Buster Bailey
All About Memphis (Felsted, 1958)
With Coleman Hawkins
 Coleman Hawkins All Stars (Swingville, 1960) with Joe Thomas
With Johnny Hodges
 Blues-a-Plenty (Verve, 1958)
With Claude Hopkins
 Swing Time! (Swingville, 1963) with Budd Johnson
With Langston Hughes
 Weary Blues (MGM, 1959)
With Budd Johnson
Blues a la Mode (Felsted, 1958)
With Jo Jones
The Main Man (Pablo, 1977)
With Al Sears
Things Ain't What They Used to Be (Swingville, 1961) as part of the Prestige Swing Festival
With Dicky Wells
Bones for the King (Felsted, 1958)
Trombone Four-in-Hand (Felsted, 1959)
With Joe Williams
 A Night at Count Basie's (Vanguard, 1956)
With Lester Young
 The Jazz Giants '56 (Verve, 1956)

References 

1906 births
1984 deaths
Musicians from Ohio
People from Xenia, Ohio
African-American jazz musicians
American jazz trombonists
Male trombonists
Count Basie Orchestra members
20th-century trombonists
American male jazz musicians
World's Greatest Jazz Band members
Saints & Sinners (jazz band) members
Vanguard Records artists
Sackville Records artists
Black & Blue Records artists
20th-century American male musicians